Gualán is a town and municipality in the Guatemalan department of Zacapa. It is located in the Eastern part of the country about 165 Kilometers from Guatemala City on route CA-9.

Population

As of 1850, Gualán had an estimated population of 2,000.

Economy
Produces: Tomato, Sugar Cane, Fish, Coffee, and as with the whole of Zacapa department, has a considerable amount of Manufacturing Industry (although Dirty Industry is present as well), mainly Regional companies providing services and products targeted towards local customs.

Holidays 
May 6 to May 8 is the celebration feast in honor of Saint Michael, the Archangel.

References

Municipalities of the Zacapa Department